Bodinger is a German surname. Notable people with the surname include:

 Herzl Bodinger (born 1943), Israeli general
 Klaus Bodinger (1932–1994), German swimmer

See also
 Bolinger
 Budinger

German-language surnames